Oscar Berger may refer to:
Óscar Berger (born 1946), President of Guatemala
Oscar Berger (cartoonist) (1901–1977), caricaturist and cartoonist born in Czechoslovakia
Oscar Berger-Levrault (1826–1903), French inventor